Murad Raas is a Pakistani politician who is the former Provincial Minister of Punjab for School Education, is in office since 27 August 2018 to 2021. He had been a member of the Provincial Assembly of the Punjab from August 2018 till January 2023. Previously he was a Member of the Provincial Assembly of the Punjab from May 2013 to May 2018.

Early life and education
He was born on 6 June 1969 in Gujrat.

He received his early education from Aitchison College. He has the degree of Bachelor of Business Administration in Finance which he obtained in 1993 from Eastern Kentucky University. He received an Honorary degree of Doctor of Philosophy in Business Administration in 2010 from an unaccredited for-profit college, American Heritage University of Southern California

He allegedly holds an American citizenship.

Political career

He was elected to the Provincial Assembly of the Punjab as a candidate of Pakistan Tehreek-e-Insaf (PTI) from Constituency PP-152 (Lahore-XVI) in 2013 Pakistani general election.

He was re-elected to the Provincial Assembly of the Punjab as a candidate of PTI from Constituency PP-159 (Lahore-XVI) in 2018 Pakistani general election.

On 27 August 2018, he was inducted into the provincial Punjab cabinet of Chief Minister Sardar Usman Buzdar and was appointed as Provincial Minister of Punjab for school education.

References

1969 births
Living people
Punjab MPAs 2013–2018
Pakistan Tehreek-e-Insaf MPAs (Punjab)
Aitchison College alumni
Eastern Kentucky University alumni
People from Gujrat District
Punjab MPAs 2018–2023
Provincial ministers of Punjab
Pakistani emigrants to the United States
People with acquired American citizenship